Fellow of the American College of Surgeons (or FACS) is a professional certification for a medical professional who has passed a set of criteria for education, qualification, and ethics required to join the American College of Surgeons. 

FACS is used as a post-nominal title, such as John Citizen, MD, FACS.

External links
American College of Surgeons

Surgery
Professional titles and certifications